"Bella Traición" (English: "Beautiful Betrayal"), is the official second single from Belinda's second studio album Utopía (2006).

Information 
The song debuted at number 32 in the U.S. Billboard Hot Latin Tracks and at number 28 in Los 40 Principales. On August 29, 2007, the song received a Latin Grammy nomination for Song of the Year. The English version called "End Of the Day", was featured on the re-release of the album, known as Utopía², but didn't have a release, like the other two singles.

Music video 
The music video was directed by Scott Speer who also directed Ni Freud Ni Tu Mamá. The music video begins in a library with Belinda opening a book called "Bella Traición." She then appears in an old house playing two different characters dressed in goth costumes and singing with her band. The video ends with her in the same pose as in her album cover Utopía. She is even seen in confession. The video was released March 5, 2007, and on October 18, 2007, it won for Video Of The Year at the Los Premios MTV Latinoamérica 2007.

Track listing 
These are the formats and track listings of major single releases of "Bella Traición".

 Bella Traición - Digital Download
 Bella Traición

 Bella Traición - Promo CD
 Bella Traición — Belinda
 Sufre Conmigo — Mœnia

Charts

Bella Traición

References 

2007 singles
Belinda Peregrín songs
Music videos directed by Scott Speer
Spanish-language songs
Songs written by Kara DioGuardi
Songs written by Belinda Peregrín
Songs written by Mitch Allan
2006 songs
Songs written by Nacho Peregrín
English-language Mexican songs
Song recordings produced by Mitch Allan